Panthera shawi is an extinct prehistoric cat, of which a single canine tooth was excavated in Sterkfontein cave in South Africa by Robert Broom in the 1940s. Broom described it in 1948 using the scientific name Felis shawi.
It is thought to be the oldest known Panthera species in Africa.

Description 

Panthera shawi, of the Felidae family, is a subspecies of the Panthera leo species from South Africa that lived around three million years ago.  
Their teeth are more closely related to those of leopards and jaguars than to lions.

References 

 

shawi
shawi
Pliocene mammals of Africa
Fossils of South Africa
Fossil taxa described in 1948